Berwick railway station is located in Berwick, East Sussex, England. Berwick village is located nearby to the south of the A27 road.

History
The station was opened by the London and Brighton Railway on 27 June 1846 and extended in 1890; the neighbouring station cottages were built in 1846 and 1892. An English Heritage report called Berwick 'in all one of the most complete wayside country station ensembles.'

Signal box
The signal box was a Saxby & Farmer Type 5 box, erected in 1879 and retained its original lever frame and its semaphore signalling. Following an upgrade by Network Rail, the signal box closed in February 2015 with the area controlled from Sussex Regional Operations Centre at Three Bridges.

Services 

The typical off-peak service is one train per hour to Brighton and one train per hour to Hastings via Eastbourne. On Sundays the service to Hastings terminates at Eastbourne.

The station's booking office on the Eastbourne-bound platform is staffed part-time. The PERTIS ticket machine was located on this platform but has now been replaced with a Shere passenger-operated self-service ticket machine. A METRIC self-service car park ticket machine is located at the entrance to the Eastbourne-bound platform.

A further Shere passenger-operated self-service ticket machine is located on the London-bound platform.

Gallery

See also 
 Berwick-upon-Tweed railway station
 North Berwick railway station
 Cuckmere Brickworks railway

References

External links 

 Berwick railway station on Trainspots

Railway stations in East Sussex
DfT Category E stations
Former London, Brighton and South Coast Railway stations
Railway stations in Great Britain opened in 1846
Railway stations served by Govia Thameslink Railway
1846 establishments in England
Wealden District